Alfred "Alf" Watson (birth unknown – death unknown) was an English professional rugby league footballer who played in the 1930s and 1940s. He played at representative level for England, and at club level for Wakefield Trinity (Heritage № 419), Leeds (Heritage № 568) and Featherstone Rovers (Heritage № 303).

Background
During the Second World War, Watson served as a lance-corporal in the Duke of Wellington's Regiment and was captured by German forces during the Battle of France on 11 June 1940. He was held in prisoner of war camps in Germany until his release in June 1945.

Playing career

International honours
Watson won a cap for England while at Leeds in 1938 against Wales.

County Cup Final appearances
Watson played  in Wakefield Trinity's 2-9 defeat by York in the 1936–37 Yorkshire County Cup Final during the 1936–37 season at Headingley Rugby Stadium, Leeds on Saturday 17 October 1936.

Club career
Watson made his début for Wakefield Trinity in the 11-8 victory over Acton and Willesden R.L.F.C., and he made his début for Featherstone Rovers on Saturday 5 March 1949.

References

External links
Search for "Watson" at rugbyleagueproject.org
Leeds paid £5 more, so he bought mum a fur coat 

British Army personnel of World War II
British World War II prisoners of war
Duke of Wellington's Regiment soldiers
England national rugby league team players
English rugby league players
Featherstone Rovers players
Leeds Rhinos players
Place of death missing
Rugby league locks
Rugby league players from Wakefield
Wakefield Trinity players
Year of birth missing
Year of death missing
World War II prisoners of war held by Germany